An Anthology of African Music is a series of recordings of traditional music that was made for the International Music Council by the International Institute for Comparative Music Studies and Documentation (Berlin/Venice) and released on the Musicaphon label by Bärenreiter (Kassel/Basel/London). The series was directed by Paul Collaer.  It was part of the larger and longer enduring UNESCO Collection series.

Recordings
 Music of the Dan — BM 30 L 2301
Reissued as Rounder CD 5105.  Review by Adam Greenberg on Allmusic, [].
 Music from Rwanda — BM 30 L 2302
Reissued as Rounder CD 5106.  Review by Adam Greenberg on Allmusic, [].
 Ba-Benzélé Pygmies — BM 30 L 2303
Reissued as Rounder CD 5107.  Review by Eugene Chadbourne on Allmusic, [].
The three albums above (Dan through Ba-Benzélé Pygmies) were reviewed by David Rycroft in Journal of the International Folk Music Council 19 (1967), pp. 164-166, .
 Ethiopia I - Music of the Ethiopian Coptic Church — BM 30 L 2304
 Ethiopia II - Music of the Cushitic Peoples of South-West Ethiopia — BM 30 L 2305
These two albums reviewed by Kurt Suttner in Ethnomusicology 14, #3 (September 1970), pp. 530-532, .
 Nigeria-Hausa Music I — BM 30 L 2306
 Nigeria-Hausa Music II — BM 30 L 2307
 Music of the Senufo — BM 30 L 2308
 Chad Kanem — BM 30 L 2309
 Musics of the Central African Republic — BM 30 L 2310
Reviewed by Alan P. Merriam in Ethnomusicology 15, #2 (May 1971), pp. 300-302, .
 Nigeria III: Igbo Music — BM 30 L 2311
Reviewed by Darius L. Thieme in Ethnomusicology 36, #1 (Winter 1992), pp. 137-140, .
 Sudan I - Music of the Blue Nile Province; The Gumuz Tribe — BM 30 SL 2312 (1986)
Reissued as Auvidis D 8072.
 Sudan II - Music of the Blue Nile Province; The Ingessana and Berta Tribes — BM 30 SL 2313 (1986)
Reissued as Auvidis D 8073.
The two albums above were reviewed by Cynthia Tse Kimberlin in Ethnomusicology 34, #2 (Spring-Summer 1990), pp. 349-352, .
 Ethiopia III - Three Chordophone Traditions — BM 30 SL 2314 (c. 1985)
Reissued as Auvidis D 8074.  Reviewed by Ashenafi Kebede in Ethnomusicology 34, #1 (Winter 1990), pp. 196-198, .

See also 
UNESCO Collection

References

African traditional music